Carlotta Monti (January 20, 1907 – December 8, 1993) was an American film actress, who was W. C. Fields' companion in his last years.

Born Carlotta Montijo in Los Angeles, California, Monti appeared in B-movies and uncredited bit parts including Kiss of Araby (1933), Tarzan the Fearless (1933) and Night Cargo (1936). She met Fields in 1932 and their relationship lasted until his death in December, 1946. She had small roles in his films Man on the Flying Trapeze (1935) and Never Give a Sucker an Even Break (1941).

She died of Alzheimer's disease. She was 86.

Memoir
Monti's best-selling memoir, W. C. Fields & Me, published in 1971, described her life and experiences with Fields. It was adapted for the 1976 film W. C. Fields and Me, starring Rod Steiger as Fields and Valerie Perrine as Monti, who appeared as an extra in it.

Writings
with Cy Rice. W. C. Fields & Me. Englewood Cliffs, N.J.: Prentice-Hall, 1971.

References

External links

1907 births
1993 deaths
Actresses from Los Angeles
American film actresses
Burials at Holy Cross Cemetery, Culver City
People from Greater Los Angeles
20th-century American actresses